Bruce Turner (1922-1993) was an American jazz musician.

Bruce Turner may also refer to:

Bruce Turner (field hockey) (1930-2010), New Zealand field hockey player and cricketer
Bruce I. Turner, American diplomat